Marcel Berlins (30 October 1941 – 31 July 2019) was a French-born lawyer, legal commentator, author, broadcaster and columnist. He was best known for his work in the United Kingdom, writing for British national newspapers The Times and The Guardian, presenting BBC Radio 4's legal programme Law in Action for 16 years, and teaching Media Law at City, University of London.

Biography
Berlins was born in Marseille, France, on 30 October 1941, the only child of Jacques Berlins and his wife, Pearl, who were of Latvian Jewish origin. The couple had migrated to France before the war and ran a small hotel. When the country was occupied by the Nazis in 1940, Jacques became active in the Resistance; the family moved to a remote village in the hills near Luberon. He moved with his parents to South Africa in 1951 and stayed there until his early adulthood. Berlins completed his schooling in South Africa and only then started to learn English; he claimed to have perfected the language by reading Agatha Christie novels. He remained a French citizen, however, and voted in the 2007 French presidential election. Berlins studied law at the University of the Witwatersrand and spent his early career in the lower criminal courts of Johannesburg.

The deteriorating political situation in South Africa prompted a return to Europe, and Berlins moved to Paris. He considered enrolling as a student at the Sorbonne, but the possibility of French military service, led him to move again, to London. In London he studied for his master of laws degree at the London School of Economics.

Berlins wrote a weekly column for The Guardian, and regularly reviewed crime fiction for The Times. Berlins began presenting BBC Radio 4's legal affairs programme Law in Action in 1988, and won two  awards for Legal Broadcaster of the Year, before retiring from the programme in 2004. He was a contestant for the South of England team in the 2007 series of Radio 4's Round Britain Quiz and continued in the series until 2014. He devised and presented, for London Weekend Television, the first television drama-documentary to feature real lawyers and judges doing their job and created and edited the award-winning publication The Law Magazine.

Berlins was a visiting professor at City, University of London, in the Department of Journalism. He taught Media Law to students on the Postgraduate Diplomas in Broadcast Journalism, Magazine Journalism, Newspaper Journalism and Television Current Affairs Journalism, as well as the BA in Journalism and a Social Science.

Berlins was a fine pianist throughout his life and for a time played in a club in Lourenço Marques in Mozambique. He occasionally played on the  public piano in St Pancras railway station. In one of his final articles for The Guardian, Berlins wrote that it had been Orson Welles’s onscreen depiction of Clarence Darrow, the prominent American lawyer who defended two high-profile murderers facing the death penalty in 1924, which had encouraged his early fascination with the law and justice.

Personal life 

In 2005, Berlins married Lisa Forrell, a corporate lawyer and theatre director. Together they wrote the play Best of Motives (2002), examining how antiterrorism laws, passed following the September 11 attacks, could be used to subvert the values they were supposed to protect. The couple owned several properties, including a flat in Paris, a spacious mansion-block apartment in Bloomsbury (West End of London), and an old house in Provence, close to where Berlins had spent his childhood.

Death
Berlins died on 31 July 2019, following a brain haemorrhage.

Dr Paul Lashmar of the Department of Journalism at City, University of London, said: "Marcel really was a brilliant commentator on the law. He made it accessible to the ordinary reader. And what’s more, he did so with a sense of humanity. His wonderful writing will be missed."

Berlins is survived by his widow and a stepson and a stepdaughter.

Books
 Caught in the Act (1974), (with Geoffrey Wansell), a study of young offenders and their treatment
 Ramesh Maharaj, Barrister Behind Bars (1979), the true story of a Trinidadian lawyer’s detention
 Living Together (1982), (with Clare Dyer), on the legal pitfalls of cohabitation
 The Law Machine (1982), (with Clare Dyer), the evolution of the justice system evolved and how it operates
 The Law and You (1986), for the Consumers’ Association, examining aspects of consumer law

Plays
 Best of Motives (2002), (with Lisa Forrell), about antiterrorism laws after the September 11 attacks

References

External links 
 Marcel Berlins' columns at The Guardian
 "Marcel Berlins introduces The 50 Greatest Crime Writers list", at The Times, 23 December 2008
 "Marcel Berlins reviews the latest crime fiction ", The Times, 16 October 2004

1941 births
2019 deaths
Academics of City, University of London
French emigrants to England
British columnists
Mass media people from Marseille
French emigrants to South Africa
French people of Latvian-Jewish descent